Cascade Bluff is a low, mainly ice-covered bluff that forms the southwest wall of Mincey Glacier in the Queen Maud Mountains in Antarctica. The feature was so named by the Texas Tech Shackleton Glacier Expedition, 1962–63, because water cascades over the bluff during warm periods.

References
 

Cliffs of the Ross Dependency
Dufek Coast